The New Ireland friarbird (Philemon eichhorni) is a species of bird in the family Meliphagidae.
It is endemic to Papua New Guinea.

Its natural habitats are subtropical or tropical moist lowland forests and subtropical or tropical moist montane forests.

References

New Ireland friarbird
Birds of New Ireland Province
New Ireland friarbird
Taxonomy articles created by Polbot